Libidibia ferrea, formerly Caesalpinia ferrea, and commonly known as pau ferro, Jucá, Brazilian ironwood, morado, or leopard tree, is a tree found in Brazil and Bolivia.

Wood
Most species of Caesalpinia s.l. have poorly defined growth rings, with isolated vessels arranged in radial multiples. Pitting between vessels is alternate and covered, and fibres are generally not divided by a septum. The axial (i.e., longitudinal) parenchyma varies from a winged shape to confluent, and is irregularly storied (i.e., layered), while the rays (perpendicular to growth rings) are of variable height and generally comprise a single or double cell width. Libidibia in particular has layered longitudinal parenchyma and narrow homocellular (i.e., of uniform type) rays without crystals in the ray cells.

Uses 
Its wood is often used for making fingerboards for electric guitars and basses. It has a similar feel and similar tonal attributes to rosewood, but is near 1000 points softer on the janka hardness scale on average or more than all of the commonly traded species of rosewood except for Sisso and Amazonian rosewood. It also ranks lower in density of 5-10lbs per cubic foot compared to common rosewoods (roughly 54lbs/cf compared to 60-66lbs/cf). Though it does have a negligibly higher crushing strength and modulus of rupture than a few species of rosewood.  Pau Ferro is lighter colored having more tans and light browns contrasting darker areas of its figure .   The wood may also be used for flooring, fancy furniture, and handgun grips. It is also known by the names morado, palo santo, caviuna, Brazilian ironwood, and Bolivian rosewood, though it is not actually rosewood.

In guitar making, pau ferro is mainly used for fingerboards and bridges. Some luthiers also use it for the back and sides of acoustic guitars. The Brazilian guitar company Giannini uses laminated pau ferro in many of their classical guitars.
Although similar in many ways to rosewood, pau ferro has slightly different qualities: Its coloration ranges from coffee brown to yellow brown and purple. 

Following the expansion of CITES regulations to restrict trade on all species of rosewood in 2017, Fender began using pau ferro on models which had previously featured rosewood fretboards. Although the restrictions were lifted in 2019, pau ferro fretboards remained in place across much of the manufacturer's product range, in particular on Mexican-made instruments.
The Stevie Ray Vaughan Signature Fender Stratocaster was one of the company's first instruments to feature a pau ferro fingerboard.

Utilization as a natural product 
In the Amazon region, Libidibia ferrea has extensive use in popular medicine, known mainly as "jucá", being indicated to treat several health conditions, in the form of teas and infusions to treat bronchopulmonary conditions, diabetes, rheumatism, cancer, disorders gastrointestinal, diarrhea; in addition to topical treatment of wounds and bruises. Although it has many indications of use for treating different diseases, jucá pods are mainly used by the Amazon people for the treatment of wounds, usually in alcoholic solution, and scientific studies have already shown the healing activity of different parts of Jucá in different animal species, such as goats, rats  and donkeys. A recent study that compared different formulations and concentrations of the ethanolic extract from Jucá (Libidibia ferrea) pods showed that the natural products showed excellent healing activity in open dermal wounds in dogs, and also had moderate in vitro antimicrobial activity.

Allergy information 
Pau ferro, used as a rosewood substitute, is a strong sensitizer capable of causing acute outbreaks of allergic and irritant dermatitis in workers not previously exposed to it. This, however, has not prevented furniture factories from using the product. Apparently, most workers develop tolerance to the wood. The allergen is (R)-3,4-dimethoxydalbergion, a strong skin sensitizer.

References 

Trees of South America
Caesalpinieae
Taxa named by Edmond Tulasne